Billy Rayes was an American actor, juggler and mimic. He was touring Australia when he signed to appear as the male juvenile in Dad and Dave Come to Town (1938). He appeared alongside his wife, the American model, Leila Steppe.

After filming Rayes went back to America, where he continued to base himself. However he would return to Australia periodically to perform, particularly on the Tivoli Circuit.

References

External links

Billy Rayes at National Film and Sound Archive

American male actors
Year of birth missing
Year of death missing